Barracudasaurus is a dubious genus of ichthyosaur from the Triassic of China, containing the single species  B. maotaiensis.

Description
Barracudasaurus had elongated, conical premaxillary teeth with rounded cross-section and wide spacing. The maxilla is short anteriorly.

References

Ichthyosaurs
Fossils of China